Harry Craig Parrott (November 30, 1925 – July 2, 2019) was a politician from Ontario, Canada. He was a Progressive Conservative member of the Legislative Assembly of Ontario from 1971 to 1981 who represented the riding Oxford. He served as a cabinet minister in the government of Bill Davis.

Background
He was born in Mitchell, Ontario in 1925 and was educated in Mitchell and at the University of Toronto, receiving a D.D.S. in 1947. He was president of the Red Cross for Oxford County. He died at a hospital in Clinton, Ontario in 2019, aged 93.

Politics
Parrott was a member of the Woodstock board of education, served on city council for Woodstock.

In 1971 he ran as the Progressive Conservative candidate in the riding of Oxford. He defeated Liberal incumbent Gordon Innes by 3,024 votes. He was re-elected in 1975 and 1977.

In October 1975 he was appointed as Minister of Colleges and Universities. In August 1978, he was appointed as Minister of Environment.

Cabinet positions

References

External links
 

1925 births
2019 deaths
Members of the Executive Council of Ontario
Progressive Conservative Party of Ontario MPPs
University of Toronto alumni